Ist Ist, stylized as IST IST, is an English post-punk band based in Greater Manchester. The group consists of Adam Houghton (vocals, guitar), Mat Peters (guitar, synth), Andy Keating (bass) and Joel Kay (drums).

History
The band formed in late 2014, and gained popularity in the Manchester music scene from word-of-mouth after gigs at venues such as The Ritz, Gorilla and The Deaf Institute. After a number of singles, the band went on to release two EPs, Spinning Rooms in 2018, and Everything Is Different Now in 2019, before releasing their debut album Architecture in 2020, which reached number three on the UK Independent Albums Chart.

The band recorded their second studio album The Art of Lying during the COVID-19 lockdowns of 2020. Released on 26 November 2021 it became the first charting release for IST IST, entering the UK Albums Chart at number 87 the following week.

Discography

Albums
 Architecture (2020)
 The Art of Lying (2021)
 Protagonists (2023)

Extended plays
 B (2016)
 Spinning Rooms (2018)
 Prologue (2018)
 Everything Is Different Now (2019)
 Sessions (2019)

Live albums
 LIVE (2017)
 Live at St Philip's Church (2018)
 Live at Gorilla (2019)
 Live at Sacred Trinity Church (2020)
 Live at The Met (2020)
 Live at The Trades Club (2020)
 Live from the Attic (2020)
 Live at Manchester Academy 1 (2022)

References

Post-punk albums by English artists